Dershowitz and Dershwitz is a surname. Notable people with the surname include:

Alan Dershowitz (born 1938), American lawyer, jurist, writer and political commentator
Eli Dershwitz (born 1995), American Olympic saber fencer, junior world champion
Nachum Dershowitz, Israeli computer scientist
Zecharia Dershowitz (1859–1921), founder of one of the first Yiddish communities in America
Zvi Dershowitz (born 1928), American rabbi

Jewish surnames